Casphalia picta is a moth species in the genus Casphalia that is found in Sierra Leone. The species was first described by William Schaus and W. G. Clements in 1893.

References 

Limacodidae
Moths described in 1893
Moths of Africa